Geniostoma petiolosum, commonly known as boar tree, is a flowering plant in the Loganiaceae family. The specific epithet refers to the relatively long and narrow petioles.

Description
It is a shrub or small tree, growing to 5 m in height. The lanceolate-elliptic leaves are 5.5–14 cm long and 2–4.5 cm wide. The inflorescences are clustered, 1–2 cm long, bearing 5–20 small flowers. The ovoid-globose capsules, 6–7 mm long, contain small, black seeds in yellow pulp.

Distribution and habitat
The plant is endemic to Australia's subtropical Lord Howe Island in the Tasman Sea. It is an uncommon inhabitant of sheltered forest throughout the Island, especially at lower elevations.

References

petiolosum
Endemic flora of Lord Howe Island
Laurales of Australia
Plants described in 1869
Taxa named by Ferdinand von Mueller
Taxa named by Charles Moore